The city of Srinagar in the Union Territory of Jammu and Kashmir, India, originally had seven wooden bridges across the Jhelum River. The seven bridges  Amira, Habba, Fateh, Zaina, Aali, Nawa and Safa  were constructed between the 15th and 18th century. This number remained unchanged for at least five centuries. In the Kashmiri language, these bridges are known as kadals. Localities around them have been eponymously named.

The old seven bridges are of similar construction and made of Cedrus deodara. Apart from heavy rocks used to add weight to the foundation, the entire bridge was made of wood. A number of passages allow for the flow of water making them considerably strong against water level and flow changes. They have been reconstructed a number of times. In 1841, bridges 3 to 7 were washed away. In 1893, bridges 2 to 7 were washed away.

Bridges across the Jhelum

Other bridges

Oont Kadal 
Oont Kadal (camel bridge) is a 17th century structure located on the Dal Lake. It was restored with Germany's assistance in 2018-2021.

References

Further reading 
Books
 
 

Papers
 
 
 

Articles

External links 

 

Bridges in Srinagar